Canada Bay, a natural bay located on the east coast of the Great Northern Peninsula, Newfoundland, Canada is home to some spectacular scenery is divided into two narrow indrafts, Chimney Bay and Bide Arm. The entrance to Canada Bay is between Canada Head and Cape Daumalen.

Bays of Newfoundland and Labrador